The 1902 New York Giants season was the franchise's 20th season. The team finished with a 48–88 record, in eighth and last place in the National League,  games behind the Pittsburgh Pirates. Their .353 winning percentage remains the worst in franchise history. At the end of September, owner Andrew Freedman left baseball, with John T. Brush taking over as majority owner and team president.

Regular season

Season standings

Record vs. opponents

Notable transactions 
 August 1902: Jim Jones was released by the Giants.

Roster

Player stats

Batting

Starters by position 
Note: Pos = Position; G = Games played; AB = At bats; H = Hits; Avg. = Batting average; HR = Home runs; RBI = Runs batted in

Other batters 
Note: G = Games played; AB = At bats; H = Hits; Avg. = Batting average; HR = Home runs; RBI = Runs batted in

Pitching

Starting pitchers 
Note: G = Games pitched; IP = Innings pitched; W = Wins; L = Losses; ERA = Earned run average; SO = Strikeouts

Other pitchers 
Note: G = Games pitched; IP = Innings pitched; W = Wins; L = Losses; ERA = Earned run average; SO = Strikeouts

References

External links
1902 New York Giants season at Baseball Reference

New York Giants (NL)
San Francisco Giants seasons
New York Giants season
New York Giants
1900s in Manhattan
Washington Heights, Manhattan